Queen Elizabeth The Queen Mother received numerous decorations and honorary appointments during and after her time as consort to King George VI. Each is listed below; where two dates are shown, the first indicated the date of receiving the award or title, and the second indicates the date of its loss or renunciation follows:

Titles and styles

 4 August 190016 February 1904: The Honourable Elizabeth Bowes-Lyon
 16 February 1904 – 26 April 1923: Lady Elizabeth Bowes-Lyon
 26 April 192311 December 1936: Her Royal Highness The Duchess of York
 11 December 19366 February 1952: Her Majesty The Queen
 6 February 195230 March 2002: Her Majesty Queen Elizabeth The Queen Mother
Her British honours were read out at her funeral, held in the United Kingdom, by Sir Peter Gwynn-Jones, Garter Principal King of Arms, as follows:

In the memorial service held in Canada, her Canadian honours, the Canadian Forces Decoration and Order of Canada, were read out.

British Commonwealth and Commonwealth of Nations honours

Foreign honours

Honorary military positions
 Australia
  195330 March 2002: Colonel-in-Chief of the Royal Australian Army Medical Corps

 Canada
  193830 March 2002: Colonel-in-Chief of the Toronto Scottish Regiment (Queen Elizabeth the Queen Mother's Own)
  194730 March 2002: Colonel-in-Chief of the Black Watch (Royal Highland Regiment) of Canada
  19531974: Colonel-in-Chief of the Royal Canadian Army Medical Corps
  197730 March 2002: Colonel-in-Chief of the Canadian Forces Medical Service

 New Zealand
  193930 March 2002: Colonel-in-Chief of the New Zealand Scottish Regiment
  197730 March 2002: Colonel-in-Chief of the Royal New Zealand Army Medical Corps

 South Africa
  19471961: Colonel-in-Chief of the Witwatersrand Rifles
  19471961: Colonel-in-Chief of the Queen's Own Cape Town Highlanders
  19561961: Colonel-in-Chief of the Transvaal Scottish

 Southern Rhodesia
  1955–1965: Honorary Commissioner of the British South Africa Police
 Rhodesia
 1965–1970: Honorary Commissioner of the British South Africa Police

 United Kingdom
  19271968: Colonel-in-Chief of the King's Own Yorkshire Light Infantry
  19301961: Honorary Colonel the Hertfordshire Regiment
  19301959: Colonel-in-Chief of the Queen's Bays (2nd Dragoon Guards)
  193530 March 2002: Royal Honorary Colonel The London Scottish
  193730 March 2002: Colonel-in-Chief of the Black Watch (Royal Highland Regiment)
  19471958: Colonel-in-Chief of the 7th (Queen's Own) Hussars
  194730 March 2002: Colonel-in-Chief of the Bedfordshire and Hertfordshire Regiment
  194730 March 2002: Colonel-in-Chief of the Manchester Regiment
  194930 March 2002: Commandant-in-Chief of the Women's Royal Army Corps
  195230 March 2002: Royal Honorary Colonel of the City of London Yeomanry (Rough Riders)
  195330 March 2002: Colonel-in-Chief of the 9th Queen's Royal Lancers
  194230 March 2002: Colonel-in-Chief of the Royal Army Medical Corps
  19571961: Colonel-in-Chief of the Inns of Court Regiment
  195830 March 2002: Colonel-in-Chief of the 3rd East Anglian Regiment (16th/44th Foot)
  19581989: Royal Honorary Colonel of the University of London OTC
  195830 March 2002: Colonel-in-Chief of the King's Regiment
  195830 March 2002: Colonel-in-Chief of the Queen's Own Hussars
  195930 March 2002: Colonel-in-Chief of the 1st The Queen's Dragoon Guards
  196030 March 2002: Colonel-in-Chief of the 9th/12th Royal Lancers (Prince of Wales's)
  196130 March 2002: Royal Honorary Colonel of the Bedfordshire and Hertfordshire Regiment
  196130 March 2002: Royal Honorary Colonel of the Inns of Court & City Yeomanry,
  196430 March 2002: Colonel-in-Chief of the Royal Anglian Regiment
  196730 March 2002: Royal Honorary Colonel of the Royal Yeomanry
  196830 March 2002: Colonel-in-Chief of the Light Infantry
  199330 March 2002: Colonel-in-Chief of the Queen's Royal Hussars (The Queen's Own and Royal Irish)
  19961999: Royal Honorary Colonel of the King's Own Yorkshire Yeomanry (Light Infantry)
  19491994: Commandant-in-Chief of the Women's Royal Air Force
  196030 March 2002: Commandant-in-Chief of the RAF Central Flying School
  199430 March 2002: Commandant-in-Chief of the Women's Royal Air Force
  unk.30 March 2002: Air Chief Commandant of the Women's Royal Auxiliary Air Force
  19491957 and 199930 March 2002: Honorary Air Commodore of No. 600 Squadron RAF
  unk.30 March 2002: Commandant-in-Chief of the Women's Royal Naval Service

Honorific eponyms

Structures

Buildings
  England: Bowes-Lyon Youth Centre, Stevenage
  England: Queen Elizabeth Hospital, Birmingham
  England: Queen Elizabeth Hospital, King's Lynn
  England: Queen Elizabeth The Queen Mother Hospital, Margate
  England: Lyon Court, part of Queens' College, Cambridge.
  Scotland: Queen Mother Building, University of Dundee, Dundee
  Scotland: Queen Mother Library, University of Aberdeen, Aberdeen
  Scotland: Queen Elizabeth Wing, Stirling Royal Infirmary, Stirling

Schools
  Canada: Queen Elizabeth High School, Halifax
  Wales: Queen Elizabeth High School, Carmarthen
  England: Queen Elizabeth House, University of Oxford, Oxford
  Zimbabwe: Queen Elizabeth School, Harare

Ships
  United Kingdom: RMS Queen Elizabeth

Freedom of the City
Commonwealth realms
  1927: Glasgow
  29 August 1928: Stirling.
  1928: Dunfermline
  1935: Perth
  1936: Edinburgh
  1953: Inverness - Joint Freedom with the Queen's Own Cameron Highlanders
   1953: London
   26 July 1954: King's Lynn and West Norfolk
  1954: Dundee - Also on Behalf of the Black Watch
  1954: Ottawa
  1956: Forfar - Also on Behalf of the Black Watch
  1956: Musselburgh
  1956: Wick
  25 May 1959: Aberdeen
  13 April 1961: St Albans
  1980: Windsor and Maidenhead
  1981: Windsor
  1981: Maidenhead
  1990: Caithness

Foreign
  2000: Volgograd (Honorary Citizen)

Member and fellowships

Scholastic

See also
 List of titles and honours of Elizabeth II
 List of titles and honours of Prince Philip, Duke of Edinburgh
 List of titles and honours of Charles III
 List of titles and honours of Queen Camilla
 List of titles and honours of William, Prince of Wales
 List of titles and honours of Anne, Princess Royal
 List of titles and honours of George VI
 List of titles and honours of Mary of Teck
 List of titles and honours of Prince Arthur, Duke of Connaught and Strathearn
 List of honours of the British royal family by country

References

 
Elizabeth Bowes-Lyon
British monarchy-related lists
Queen Elizabeth The Queen Mother